Elizabeth Gray is a Canadian radio broadcaster, who has been a host and documentary producer for CBC Radio.

Previously a researcher on Cross-Country Checkup and a substitute host on This Country in the Morning and Morningside, Gray took over from Barbara Frum as cohost of As It Happens in 1981.

In a controversial decision by the show's producers, she was replaced by Dennis Trudeau in 1985. She subsequently hosted Sunday Morning for several years, and produced documentary reports for the network. More recently, with different producers in charge of As It Happens, Gray has returned to the program as an occasional guest host.

She was married to journalist John Gray.

References

Living people
Canadian talk radio hosts
Canadian radio news anchors
CBC Radio hosts
Canadian women radio journalists
Year of birth missing (living people)
Canadian Screen Award winning journalists
Canadian women radio hosts